Sheela Patel (born 1952) is an activist and academic involved with people living in slums and shanty towns.

Early life
In 1974, Patel received her Masters in Social Work from the Tata Institute of Social Sciences in Mumbai. She was then involved with a community centre called the Nagpada Neighbourhood House.

SPARC
With Prema Gopalan, Patel is the founding director of the Society for the Promotion of Area Resource Centres (SPARC), which she set up in Mumbai in 1984 as an advocacy group for the pavement dwellers of Mumbai.  SPARC continues to this day to play a major role in the politics of slum development in India and throughout the Third World. In 2000, SPARC was the recipient of the United Nations Human Settlement Award.

Groups
Patel works closely with the National Slum Dwellers Federation (NSDF) and Mahila Milan, two community-based groups working on with the poor in Indian cities. She worked in the National Technical Advisory Group (NTAG) for the Jawaharlal Nehru National Urban Renewal Mission (JNNURM).

She has founded the Asian Coalition for Housing Rights, the Asian Women and Shelter Network and Swayam Shikshan Prayog (SSP), an organisation that works with women's collectives in more than 600 villages in Maharashtra.

Patel is also a founder and current chairperson of Slum Dwellers International, a network of community-based organisations in 33 countries spanning Africa, Asia, Latin America and the Caribbean.

Awards
2011: Padma Shri award, the fourth highest civilian honor in India.

2009: David Rockefeller Bridging Leadership Award 

2000: UN-Habitat Scroll of Honour Award

Selected works
Patel, Sheela; Arputham, Jockin; Bartlett, Sheridan. 2015. '"We beat the path by walking": How the women of Mahila Milan in India learned to plan, design, finance and build housing.' Environment & Urbanization, 28(1) Free access
Patel, Sheela. 2013. 'Upgrade, Rehouse or Resettle? An Assessment of the Indian Government's Basic Services for the Urban Poor (BSUP) Programme'. Environment & Urbanization, 25(1): 177-188.
Patel, Sheela. 2012. 'Supporting data collection by the poor' Alliance Magazine
Patel, Sheela; Baptist, Carrie Baptist; D'Cruz, Celine. 2012. 'Knowledge is power – Informal Communities Assert Their Right to the City through SDI and Community-led Enumerations'. Environment & Urbanization, 24(1).
Patel, Sheela. 2011. 'Are Women Victims, or Are They Warriors?' in Women's Health and the World's Cities, chapter 6, (eds) Afaf Ibrahim, Meleis, Eugénie L. Birch, Susan M. Wachter, Philadelphia: University of Pennsylvania Press.
 Patel, Sheela. 2011. 'Recasting the Vision of Megacities in the South. Emerging Challenges for the North-South Dialogue in Development', in (ed)Robertson-von Trotha, Caroline Y. (ed.): Europe: Insights from the Outside Kulturwissenschaft interdisziplinär/Interdisciplinary Studies on Culture and Society, Vol 5 Baden-Baden
Patel, Sheela & Mitlin, Diana. 2010. 'Gender Issues and Slum/Shack Dweller Federations' (report). International Institute for Environment and Development.
Patel, Sheela; Sheuya, Shaaban; Howden-Chapman, Philippa . 2007. 'The Design of Housing and Shelter Programs: The Social and Environmental Determinants of Inequalities' in Journal of Urban Health, 84(1) 98-108.
Patel, Sheela; Burra, Sundar; D'Cruz, Celine. 2001 'Slum/Shack Dwellers International (SDI) – Foundations to treetops' in Environment and Urbanization 13(2) 45-59.

References

Indian urban planners
1952 births
Living people
Recipients of the Padma Shri in social work
20th-century Indian architects
Indian women architects
20th-century Indian women artists
20th-century Indian educators
Indian women activists
Indian human rights activists
Artists from Mumbai
Women artists from Maharashtra